Maiava is a surname. Notable people with the surname include:

 Hutch Maiava (born 1976), New Zealand-born Samoan rugby league footballer
 Kaluka Maiava (born 1986), American football player
 Neff Maiava (1924–2018), American Samoan professional wrestler